Wilfrid-Eldège Lauriault was a politician Quebec, Canada and a Member of the Legislative Assembly of Quebec (MLA).

Early life

He was born on November 24, 1899 in Montreal and became an engineer.

Member of the legislature

He ran as an Action libérale nationale candidate in the district of Montréal–Saint-Henri in the 1935 provincial election and won. Lauriault refused to join Maurice Duplessis's Union Nationale. Instead, he ran as an Independent Liberal in the 1936 election and lost against René Labelle.

Federal politics

Lauriault ran as an Independent Liberal in the federal district of Saint-Henri in 1940 and finished second.

City Councillor

Lauriault won a seat to the City Council of Montreal in 1944. He was re-elected in 1947, 1950, 1954 and 1957. He was defeated in 1960.

Death

He died on November 13, 1976 in Montreal.

Footnotes

1899 births
1976 deaths
Action libérale nationale MNAs
Montreal city councillors